Garden Village is located near Gorseinon, Wales.  It falls within the City and County of Swansea's Kingsbridge ward.

Villages in Swansea